Schwendisee is a small lake above Wildhaus on the slopes of the Churfirsten, in Toggenburg, Canton of St. Gallen, Switzerland. Besides the main lake (Vorderer Schwendisee), there is a smaller lake nearby (Hinterer Schwendisee).

Sediment cores from the lakes have been studied and provide a record of the climate of the last 600 years.

Schwendisee is a combination of two words - ‘Schwendi’ and ‘see’ where Schwandi refers to the glacier that melted about 1400 years ago to form the lakes and ‘see’ translates to lake in English. The elevation of the lake is about 1150 metres above sea level. 

Schwendisee is nestled in a moorland where the waterbody is divided into the front Schwendisee and the back Schwendisee separated by a forest strip. The front Schwendisee is open to visitors for fishing, swimming and hiking. It is about 250m long and 150m wide and is the larger of the two. A broadwalk extends to the middle of the lake to allow visitors to enter the water body. Both lakes are surrounded by dense reeds and marshes and also have small creeks feeding the flora. 

Visitors can find barbeque facilities at either side of the lake and the Hotel Seegüetli on the northern end of the lake.

References

Lakes of the canton of St. Gallen
Lakes of Switzerland
LSchwendisee